D'Ávila Messi Kessie (born 20 January 2000) is an Ivorian professional footballer who last played as a winger for Super League 2 club Panserraikos.

References

2000 births
Living people
Ivorian footballers
Ivorian expatriate footballers
Expatriate footballers in Spain
Expatriate footballers in Greece
Ivorian sportspeople
Ivorian expatriate sportspeople
Ivorian expatriate sportspeople in Spain
Ivorian expatriate sportspeople in Greece
Tercera División players
CD Huétor Vega players
Super League Greece 2 players
Panserraikos F.C. players
Association football forwards